Charles Emmanuel Joseph, 1st Prince de Gavre, 4th Marquess of Ayseaux, Count of the Empire (died 1773) was the first Prince de Gavre, created by Emperor Charles VI in 1736. He was the son of Rasse II François of Gavre, 3rd Marquess of Ayseau, and Marie Catherine de Brias. 

He was Grand marshall at the imperial court of Charles Alexander of Lorraine, governor of the Austrian Netherlands, and knight of the Golden Fleece.

Marriage and issue
He married Louise Theresia de Waha and had descendants:

 François I Joseph, 2nd Prince de Gavre (1731-1797), Lord Chamberlain, Knight of the Golden Fleece,married Marie-Anne de Rouveroy de Pamele (1730-1804), Lady of the Starry Cross.
Charles II Alexandre François, 3rd Prince de Gavre: Knight of the Belgian Lion and Saint Hubert.married to Maria-Thecla, Countess vom Egger
François II Antoine, 4th prince de Gavre, Lord Chamberlain of the King of Holland
Leopold Joseph de Gavre
 Marie Maximiliane de Gavre, married Hermann, Prince of Hohenzollern-Hechingen
Friedrich Hermann Otto, Prince of Hohenzollern-Hechingen, married Princess Pauline, Duchess of Sagan
 Marie Charlotte de Gavre
Marie Christine de Gavre, Lady of the Starry Cross,married Philippe-Joseph du Sart
 Eugène de Gavre
 Marie-Theodore de Gavre,married to Honore-Ignace de Glymes-Brabant, son of Ignace-François de Glymes-Brabant, Lord of la Falize
Marie-Albertine de Gavre;married Maximilien, Prince of Hornes
Marie-Thérèse-Josepha de Hornes:married Prince Philip Joseph of Salm-Kyrburg. 
10 children, and descendance including the current Kings of Romania, Portugal, Belgium.

References 

Knights of the Golden Fleece
Princes of Gavre

1773 deaths
Year of birth unknown